Michael Stuart Beavon (born 30 November 1958 in Wolverhampton, England) is an English former footballer.

Career

Tottenham Hotspur
Beavon started his football career as an apprentice with Tottenham Hotspur. He then joined the first-team squad in 1978, and spent time on loan at Notts County for the 1979-80 season.

Reading
Beavon joined Reading in 1980. Here, he made a total of 396 league appearances, scoring 44 goals.

Northampton Town
Beavon joined Northampton Town in 1990. He made a total of 98 league appearances and 14 goals.

Newbury Town
Beavon joined Newbury Town in 1993.

Personal life
He is the son of the former late footballer Cyril Beavon. He is also the father of football player Stuart Beavon.
He is now working as a Self-Employed Painter.

References

1958 births
Living people
Footballers from Wolverhampton
English footballers
Association football midfielders
Tottenham Hotspur F.C. players
Notts County F.C. players
Reading F.C. players
Northampton Town F.C. players
Newbury Town F.C. players
English Football League players